Jan & Kjeld were a musical duo from Denmark, consisting of brothers Jan and Kjeld Wennick, both singers and banjo players. The duo, active in the late 1950s and early 1960s, was especially successful in Germany with a number of schlager-style songs. The duo is perhaps best known for their 1960 song "Banjo Boy". In the U.S. the song was their only chart entry on the Billboard Hot 100 (#58).

Jan Wennick (born in Copenhagen, Denmark, on 27 July 1946) and Kjeld Wennick (born in Gränna, Sweden; 3 February 1944 – 31 May 2020) began performing as a duo, Jan and Kjeld, in 1956. The duo's first recording, "Tiger Rag", became a hit in Denmark and in Germany. Later that year, the   worldwide breakthrough came with the song "Banjo Boy", which reached no 1 on the German hit parade and gave the young duo a gold record and a bronze lion on the Radio Luxembourg.

In 1983, Kjeld founded a record company, Mega Records and signed the Swedish pop group Ace of Base. In 2001, he sold the record company and music publisher to Edel Records. He was subsequently a judge at a number of talent shows on Danish television.

Kjeld Wennick died of cancer at age 76. He had been diagnosed with kidney cancer three years earlier, and by the time of his death it had spread to the bones.

References

External links
Dødsannonce for Kjeld Lennart Wennick (Obituary for Kjeld Lennart Wennick)

Banjoists
Danish musicians
Family musical groups
Male musical duos
Sibling musical duos